Maggie Magode Ikuya sometimes referred to as  James Magode Ikuya is a Ugandan politician and activist. He is the State Minister for East African Community Affairs.

Persona life 
He comes from the Magodes Town Council in Tororo North County, Tororo District. However, he lived his entire adult life among the Bagusi community in Mbale District. He is married to two women and his wives hail from Sironko- Bududa and Budadili.

Career 
Maggie has worked with Uganda People's Congress (UPC), FRONASA and National Resistance Movement (NRM). When he was appointed as the State Minister, he mentioned that his appointment was an indication that  the voice of the people who had been involved in the liberation struggle has finally been heard by the government.

See also 

 Cabinet of Uganda.
 Parliament of Uganda
 National Resistance Movement
 Uganda People's Congress

External links 

 Website of the Parliament of Uganda
 https://tiengtrung.cn/wiki/en/Cabinet_of_uganda

References 

Living people
Members of the Parliament of Uganda
People from Tororo District
People from Mbale District
Year of birth missing (living people)